The 1979–80 Athenian League season was the 57th in the history of Athenian League. The league consisted of 20 teams.

Clubs
The league joined 2 new teams:
 Banstead Athletic, from London Spartan League Premier Division
 Woodford Town, from Essex Senior League

League table

References

1979–80 in English football leagues
Athenian League